D.H. Conley High School is a high school in Greenville, North Carolina. It was founded in 1970 and named for Donald Hayes Conley, an educational leader and former superintendent of Pitt County Schools.

Athletics 

D.H. Conley competes in the 3A/4A Big East Conference and offers the many sports for students, including softball, volleyball, soccer, baseball, football, swimming, tennis, basketball, wrestling, track, cross country, and cheerleading.

Athletic NCHSAA state championships 
3-A Men's Basketball – 1987, 1990
3-A Baseball – 2006
4-A Baseball – 2005
Cheerleading – 2003 
3-A Volleyball – 1986, 2007, 2020-21
3-A Men's Wrestling – 1995
3-A Softball – 2011, 2013
4-A Softball – 2015

Clubs 
Most of Conley's honor societies promote volunteering, of which students can gain points for to wear cords at graduation.

The Quiz Bowl club appeared on television in 2005 for the state championship, placing second. The Quiz Bowl team also placed second in the state championship in 2013.

Classes 
As the largest school in Pitt County, with 1,710 students, D.H. Conley is able to offer many classes with standard, honors, and AP levels.  Furthermore, distance learning is also available to connect with other schools in Pitt County to offer more classes.  The day is divided into four periods on block scheduling with ninety-minute classes. Four lunches are served daily during third period. Some classes, like yearbook and journalism, require an application process.  The yearbook is called the Valkyrian, and the newspaper is called The Shield.

Notable alumni

 Holton Ahlers, American football quarterback

 Keith Gatlin, professional basketball player and assistant college coach with the High Point Panthers
 Rico Hines, NBA player development coach with the Sacramento Kings and former UCLA basketball player
 Bronswell Patrick, former MLB relief pitcher
 Alex White, former MLB pitcher for the Colorado Rockies
 Bryant Packard, minor league baseball player in the Detroit Tigers organization.

References 

Public high schools in North Carolina
Schools in Pitt County, North Carolina
1970 establishments in North Carolina
Educational institutions established in 1970